Abu Khalid Thawr ibn Yazid ibn Ziyad al-Kula'i died 775 AD, was an Islamic scholar of the 8th century. He lived in Jerusalem after being forced out of Homs because of his opinions. He was in conflict with Malik ibn Anas and had been accused of belonging to the Qadariyya school. 

His tomb is in Tripoli, Lebanon.

External references
 

770 deaths
8th-century Muslim scholars of Islam
8th-century Arabs
Year of birth unknown
8th-century people from the Abbasid Caliphate